Sri Lankan or Ceylonese may refer to:

 Something of, from, or related to the country of Sri Lanka
 A person from Sri Lanka, see Demographics of Sri Lanka
 Sinhalese people, the ethnic majority
 Sri Lankan Tamils, an ethnic minority 
 Sri Lankan Moors, an ethnic minority 
 Sri Lankan Malays, an ethnic minority
  Burgher people, an ethnic minority
 Sri Lankan culture
 Sri Lankan cuisine
 SriLankan Airlines

See also
 

Language and nationality disambiguation pages